Judson Leroy Day (October 8, 1977 – September 14, 1944) was an American dentist and politician.

Day was born on a farm in Castle Rock, Dakota County, Minnesota. He went to the Pillsbury Academy and to the University of Minnesota Dental School. He lived in Clinton Falls, Steele County, Minnesota with his wife and family and was a dentist. Day served in the Minnesota House of Representatives from 1931 to 1934. His brother Walter Edwin Day also served in the Minnesota House of Representatives.

References

1877 births
1944 deaths
People from Dakota County, Minnesota
People from Steele County, Minnesota
University of Minnesota School of Dentistry alumni
American dentists
Members of the Minnesota House of Representatives